The 1965 Philippine Sea A-4 crash was a Broken Arrow incident in which a United States Navy Douglas A-4E Skyhawk attack aircraft carrying a nuclear weapon fell into the sea off Japan from the aircraft carrier . The aircraft, pilot and weapon were never recovered.

The accident
On 5 December 1965, 31 days after Ticonderogas departure from U.S. Naval Base Subic Bay in the Philippines, the attack jet fell over the side during a training exercise while being rolled from the number 2 hangar bay to the number 2 elevator. The pilot, Lieutenant (junior grade) Douglas M. Webster; the aircraft, Douglas A-4E BuNo 151022 of VA-56; and the B43 nuclear bomb were never recovered from the  depth. The accident was said to occur  from Kikai Island, Kagoshima Prefecture, Japan.

Ticonderoga had aboard Carrier Air Wing Five during this cruise, with two squadrons of Skyhawks. The lost aircraft was part of Attack Squadron 56 (VA-56); VA-144 was the other.

Number of weapons
Though most sources state that a single weapon was involved, a document from Los Alamos National Lab indicates that two weapons were involved.

Revelation
It was not until 1989 that the United States Department of Defense revealed the proximity of the lost one-megaton H-bomb to Japanese territory. The revelation inspired a diplomatic inquiry from Japan requesting details.

See also
 Broken Arrow (nuclear)
 List of military nuclear accidents

References

1965 in military history
Aviation accidents and incidents in 1965
Aviation accidents and incidents involving nuclear weapons
Cold War military history of the United States
1965 in Japan
United States Navy in the 20th century
Philippine Sea
Japan–United States relations
December 1965 events in Asia